Tracy Delatte (born December 22, 1956) is a former professional tennis player from the United States.

Delatte enjoyed most of his tennis success playing doubles. During his career, he won three doubles titles. He achieved a career-high doubles ranking of world no. 39 in 1984.

Career finals

Doubles 9 (3–6)

External links
 
 

American male tennis players
Sportspeople from New Orleans
Cajun people
Tennis people from Louisiana
Living people
1956 births